USS LST-456 was a United States Navy  used in the Asiatic-Pacific Theater during World War II.

Construction
LST-456 was laid down on 3 August 1942, under Maritime Commission (MARCOM) contract, MC hull 976, by  Kaiser Shipyards, Vancouver, Washington; launched on 20 October 1942; and commissioned on 3 February 1943.

Service history
During the war, LST-456 was assigned to the Pacific Theater of Operations. She took part in the Eastern New Guinea operations, the Lae occupation in September 1943, and the Saidor occupation in January and February 1944; the Bismarck Archipelago operations, the Cape Gloucester, New Britain, landings from December 1943 through February 1944, and the Admiralty Islands landings in February and March 1944; the Hollandia operation in April 1944; the Western New Guinea operations, the Toem-Wakde-Sarmi area operation in May 1944, the Biak Islands operation in May and June 1944, the Cape Sansapor operation in July and August 1944, and the Morotai landing in September 1944; the Leyte landings in October 1944; the Lingayen Gulf landings in January 1945; the Mindanao Island landings in  April 1945; and the Balikpapan operation in June and July 1945.

Post-war service
Following the war, LST-456 performed occupation duty in the Far East until early February 1946. She served with the Military Sea Transportation Service (MSTS) as USNS T-LST-456 from 31 March 1952, until she was struck from the Navy list on 15 June 1973.

Merchant service
On 27 September 1973, the ship was sold to the Maritime Co. Ltd., Khorramshahr, Iran, and renamed Karkas. On 1 February 1993, she was sold to Al Jazya Mar. y Sh. Ag., United Arab Emirates and renamed Bshair, and reflagged for Bolivia. She has since been deleted from the Bolivian ship register and her fate is unknown.

Honors and awards
LST-456 earned eight battle stars for her World War II service.

Notes 

Citations

Bibliography 

Online resources

External links

 

LST-1-class tank landing ships
World War II amphibious warfare vessels of the United States
1942 ships
S3-M2-K2 ships
Ships built in Vancouver, Washington